The Güllübağ Dam is a gravity dam near the town of Güllübağ on the Çoruh River in Erzurum Province, Turkey. The primary purpose of the dam is hydroelectric power production. Construction on the river diversion tunnel began in 2009 and the dam was complete in 2012. That same year the first generator became operational and the final generator was operational in March 2013. The dam is part of the Çoruh Development Plan and it is owned by Turkey's State Hydraulic Works.

See also

Aksu Dam – under construction downstream

References

Dams in Erzurum Province
Hydroelectric power stations in Turkey
Dams on the Çoruh River
Gravity dams
Dams completed in 2012
Roller-compacted concrete dams
2012 establishments in Turkey
Energy infrastructure completed in 2013
21st-century architecture in Turkey